Dreaming is a 1944 British comedy film directed by John Baxter and starring Bud Flanagan, Chesney Allen and Hazel Court. Its plot concerns a soldier who is knocked unconscious during a train journey and has a series of bizarre dreams.

In 1944, Decca Records released a recording of Flanagan and Allen singing Dreaming, the title song from the film.

The film's sets were designed by Duncan Sutherland.

Plot
When British soldier Bud (Bud Flanagan) is hit on the head, the concussion causes a series of dreams whilst on the hospital operating table. In these he is fleeing hostile tribes in Africa, is a jockey winning a race at Ascot, turns up in Nazi Germany and is opening a wartime services canteen.

Main cast
 Bud Flanagan as Bud
 Chesney Allen as Ches
 Hazel Court as Miss Grey / Wren / Avalah
 Dick Francis as Sir Charles Paddock
 Philip Wade as Dr. Goebbels
 Gerry Wilmot as American General
 Peter Bernard as American Soldier
 Ian McLean as British General
 Roy Russell as Trainer
 Robert Adams as Translator

Critical reception
Allmovie wrote, "There's not much in the way of plot, but Flanagan & Allen seldom needed plots, merely premises."

References

External links

1944 films
1944 comedy films
1940s English-language films
Films directed by John Baxter
British comedy films
Films set in England
Films set in Africa
Films set in London
British black-and-white films
1940s British films